Loudoun Castle was a theme park set around the ruins of the 19th century Loudoun Castle near Galston, in the Loudoun area of Ayrshire, Scotland, United Kingdom. The park opened in 1995, and closed at the end of the 2010 season. The park's mascot was Rory the Lion.

History
The park was opened in 1995 by a company based in London and has since been through the hands of travelling showman Raymond Codona to its current owner, Henk Bembom's Parkware Ltd. Bembom took over the park in 2002 and invested £5m during his first year there, followed by an additional £2m in the second. Bembom continued to bring new rides and attractions to the park each year, including another £2m worth of investment in 2007. In winter 2006, Parkware moved all their operations and ride stock to Loudoun from their previous storage buildings in Margate.

On 15 July 2007, 18-year-old ride operator Mark Blackwood fell  from a roller coaster he was pushing, the Rat, which had got stuck.  He was taken to Crosshouse Hospital in Kilmarnock for treatment but died there on Monday 16 July 2007. After a two-week trial, the jury found the park owners not guilty of failing to provide proper training and supervision at Kilmarnock Sheriff Court on Saturday 10 October 2009.

In September 2010 it was announced that the park had closed, Bembom stating that it was "no longer economically viable." There were no clear indications as to the future use of the site, whether the current owners intend to sell the business on as a 'going concern' or if they intended to use the site for other purposes.  a number of rides were for sale, including Twist 'n' Shout, Goldrush, Barnstormer, Wacky Worm, Crows Nest and Jammy Dodgems.  As a Category A listed building, the possibilities for any redevelopment of the ruins of Loudon Castle proper, as opposed to this adjacent theme park, are severely limited by law.

Rides

Many of the rides at Loudoun Castle had been operated at Dreamland Margate in Kent when it was owned by Bembom Brothers. A few of these rides can be seen in the Only Fools and Horses 1989 Christmas Special "The Jolly Boys' Outing", in which the Trotters and many other male cast members visit Dreamland Margate.

In 2009, Loudoun Castle had five roller coasters:
Gold Rush – a Zierer Four Man Bob coaster
Slitherin' – a Schwarzkopf Jet 400
Twist 'n' Shout – a classic looping Schwarzkopf Silverarrow
The Rat – a Maurer Söhne Wild Mouse
Wacky Worm – a junior coaster by I.E. Park

Also in the park were various thrill rides including:
 Barnstormer – a  shot-and-drop tower built by S&S Power. Relocated from the defunct Pleasureland Southport, the ride was officially opened on 23 May 2006 by The MacDonald Brothers.
 Loggers Leap – Loudoun's original log flume
 Black Pearl – an inverting Pirate ship. Relocated to Lightwater Valley.
 The Captains Wheel – an Enterprise ride. Relocated to Avonturenpark Hellendoorn.
 The Plough – the largest Chair-O-Planes ride in the world (originally operated as The Apollo 14 at Ponypark Slagharen)
 The Crow's Nest – a HUSS Troika
 The Milk Churn  – Round-Up made by Frank Hrubetz – Now at Treasure Island Stourport www.stourportfair.co.uk
 HMS Flora McDougal – a HUSS Swinging Ship ride. Relocated to Lightwater Valley.

References

Defunct amusement parks in the United Kingdom
Amusement parks opened in 1995
Amusement parks closed in 2010
Modern ruins
de:Loudoun Castle